Lorenzo Coullaut Valera (1876 – 1932) was a Spanish sculptor. Born in Marchena, he grew up in Nantes where his family had moved. He studied at the Livet Lyceum and returned to Spain in 1893.

With the support of his uncle, Juan Valera, whose bust he sculpted, Coullaut Valera participated in the National Exposition of Belles Artes in 1897, and received Honorable Mention.  Much of the work of Coullaut Valera can be seen in public squares in cities across Spain, as well as in Latin America.  He died in Madrid.

Federico Coullaut-Valera, his son, was also a sculptor who has designed public monuments.

Selected works
 1913 - Monumento los Saineteros, Madrid
 1914 - Monument of Campoamor, Madrid
 1916 - Monument of Pardo Bazán, A Coruña
 1917 - Monument of Menéndez Pelayo, Madrid
 1918 - Monument of the Immaculate Conception, Plaza del Triunfo, Seville
 1926 - Monument of Hosius of Córdoba, Córdoba
 1928 - Monument of Juan Valera, Madrid
 1930 - Monument of Miguel de Cervantes, Madrid
 1931 - Monument of Bruno Mauricio de Zabala, Montevideo
 La Caridad Real in a  Monument of Alfonso XII, Retiro Gardens,

External links
  Lorenzo Coullaut Valera
 Monuments Page 

1876 births
1932 deaths
20th-century Spanish sculptors
20th-century Spanish male artists
Spanish male sculptors